In music, Op. 111 stands for Opus number 111. Compositions that are assigned this number include:
 Beethoven – Piano Sonata No. 32
 Brahms – String Quintet No. 2
 Dvořák – A Hero's Song
 Fauré – Fantaisie
 Prokofiev – Symphony No. 6
 Shostakovich – Novorossiysk Chimes

Op. 111 may also refer to:
 Dix pièces by Jean Absil; see List of compositions for guitar#1960s
 Piano Sonata No. 7 in E-flat major; see List of compositions by Isaac Albéniz#Works with opus numbers
 Flute Concerto No. 2, see List of compositions by Malcolm Arnold#Concerto
 Foxfire Overture for Symphonic Band, see James Barnes (composer)#Works for concert band
 From Olden Times, see List of compositions by Amy Beach#Keyboard
 "Impromptu". by Paul Bernard
 Suite; see List of compositions by York Bowen#Piano 4-hands
 Pot Pourri; see List of compositions by Ferdinando Carulli#Works With Opus Numbers
 Souvenirs Lointains, see List of compositions by Cécile Chaminade#Works with opus number
 Suite for saxophone quartet, see Paul Creston#Chamber music
 Zwei Romanzen für Klavier zu drei Händen, see List of compositions by Carl Czerny#By opus number
 Ariel for violin and piano; see František Drdla#Violin and piano
 4 Klavierstücke, see Robert Fuchs#Solo
 Piano Suite in E, see Jack Gibbons#Solo piano
 Morceaux de Ballet, see Stephen Heller#Works
 Grande fantaisie sur la Romanesca, fameux air de danse du XVIe siècle, see List of compositions by Henri Herz#Piano Solo
 Symphonietta in D major for wind and brass, The Sleeper; see List of compositions by Joseph Holbrooke#Other
 Pastorale No. 1; see List of compositions by Alan Hovhaness
 Mass No. 3 for Soloists, Chorus, and Orchestra in D major, see List of compositions by Johann Nepomuk Hummel#By opus numbers
 "Gingerbread Man", see List of compositions by Nikolai Kapustin
 What Price Confidence?, a 1944 opera by Ernst Krenek
 Lieder aus alter Zeit, see Theodor Kullak#Piano Solo 
 La Chasse, see List of compositions by Henry Litolff#Piano solo
 Fantasia apocaliptica, see Erkki Melartin#Piano
 Sinfonia da requiem, see Krzysztof Meyer#Works for orchestra
 4 Grandes Etudes de Concert, see List of compositions by Ignaz Moscheles#Works with Opus Number
 Te Deum for soprano, bass, mixed choir and orchestra, see Pehr Henrik Nordgren#Choral
 Ballade, see Dianne Goolkasian Rahbee#Piano
 Organ Sonata No. 5 in F-sharp Minor by Josef Rheinberger (unofficial numbering); see 1878 in music
 Das Lied von der Glocke by Andreas Romberg, see Song of the Bell#Recitations and musical settings
 3 Fantasiestücke by Robert Schumann
 Intrada, Op. 111a or Surusoitto, Op. 111b; see List of compositions by Jean Sibelius#Organ
 3 Part-Songs, for SATB; see List of compositions by Charles Villiers Stanford#Miscellaneous
 Indianer-Galopp; see Johann Strauss I#Galops and polkas
 Blumenfest; see List of compositions by Johann Strauss II#Polkas
 Divertimento Piccolo, see José Carlos Amaral Vieira#List of compositions
 Pozdravlyayem!, a 1975 opera by Mieczysław Weinberg

See also
 Opus 111, an imprint of Naïve Records